Dick Arbuckle (born May 15, 1939) is a former American football coach.  He served as the head football coach at Western Oregon University and Oregon Institute of Technology, Klamath Falls.

Arbuckle's Sheldon High School teams had notable success, including the 1980 team that finished undefeated in District 5AAA play, and whose only loss came to eventual state champion Beaverton, on the way to a 12-1 season.

Arbuckle served as the head football coach at Oregon Tech from 1981 to 1982, compiling a record of 14–5. He then served as the Western Oregon head coach from 1983 to 1984, earning a record of 6–12–2.

He would later go on to serve on a number Division I staffs, including two stints as an assistant for Bruce Snyder at Cal and Arizona State.

Head coaching record

College

References

1939 births
Living people
American football quarterbacks
American football safeties
Arizona State Sun Devils football coaches
Boise State Broncos football coaches
California Golden Bears football coaches
Montana Grizzlies football coaches
Oregon Ducks football coaches
Oregon Ducks football players
Oregon State Beavers football coaches
Oregon Tech Hustlin' Owls football coaches
Western Oregon Wolves football coaches
High school football coaches in Oregon
Sports coaches from Los Angeles
Coaches of American football from California
Players of American football from Los Angeles